Jasper Bolland (born 13 May 1986) is a Dutch former professional footballer.

Club career 
Bolland started his career in his hometown for SV Houten and joined 2001 in the football academy of FC Utrecht. The midfielder made his debut in professional football, being part of the FC Utrecht squad in the 2006-07 season.

After seven years in several teams of FC Utrecht, Bolland left the club and signed with IJsselmeervogels. On 20 April 2011 he signed a two-year contract with GVVV for the 2011/2012 season.

After just one season, his contract was resigned and he joined VVA '71. After two seasons at VVA he moved on to Eemdijk.

After having played for VV Eemdijk from 2014, Bolland announced his retirement from football on 15 February 2019.

Personal life
Bolland works as an account manager for an IT business.

References

1986 births
Living people
People from Houten
Association football midfielders
Dutch footballers
FC Utrecht players
IJsselmeervogels players
GVVV players
Vierde Divisie players
Derde Divisie players
Eredivisie players
Footballers from Utrecht (province)